is a railway station on the Hokuriku Railroad Ishikawa Line in the city of Hakusan, Ishikawa, Japan, operated by the private railway operator Hokuriku Railroad (Hokutetsu).

Lines

Station layout
The station consists of one 41 m long side platform serving a single bi-directional track. A small waiting shelter is provided on the platform. The station is unattended.

Adjacent stations

History
Hibari Station opened on 14 March 2015, coinciding with the introduction of a revised timetable. A completion ceremony for the station was held on 8 March 2015.

Surrounding area
 Hibari New Town

See also
 List of railway stations in Japan

References

External links

 Hibari Station information 

Railway stations in Ishikawa Prefecture
Railway stations in Japan opened in 2015
Hokuriku Railroad Ishikawa Line
Hakusan, Ishikawa